Thomas Jones (1916 – date of death unknown) was an English footballer who played as a central defender for Accrington Stanley and Oldham Athletic, and guested for Rochdale during World War II. He was born in Little Hulton.  His career came to an end in 1945 when he lost both feet to a land mine after the D-Day Landings.

Career statistics

References

Accrington Stanley F.C. (1891) players
Oldham Athletic A.F.C. players
Rochdale A.F.C. wartime guest players
1916 births
English amputees
English footballers
Association football central defenders
Year of death missing
British Army personnel of World War II
Landmine victims